Colasposoma abdominale is a species of leaf beetle of Botswana and the Democratic Republic of the Congo. It was first described from Lake Ngami by Joseph Sugar Baly in 1864. Its length ranges from 7.5 to 11 mm.

References

abdominale
Beetles of the Democratic Republic of the Congo
Insects of Botswana
Taxa named by Joseph Sugar Baly
Beetles described in 1864